Sergeant Graham Leslie Parish GC (29 August 1912 – 16 September 1942) of the Royal Air Force Volunteer Reserve was posthumously awarded the George Cross for 'gallantry of the highest order' during the crash landing of his plane in 1942.

Biography
Prior to enlisting with the Royal Air Force Volunteer Reserve in August 1940, Parish, originally from Sheffield, had been employed as the Borough Librarian for Lytham St Annes at the St Annes-on-the-Sea Carnegie Library.

16 September 1942
Parish was the observer on an aircraft operating a delivery flight to the Middle East Command which crashed after attempting to return to base in Sudan due to the failure of the port engine on 16 September 1942.

Most of the crew managed to get clear as the bomber burst into flames but one man had suffered two broken legs and was trapped. The bomber was engulfed and neither Parish or the passenger survived but when their charred bodies were recovered it was clear that Parish had carried him eight yards from the blocked emergency door to the rear turret in the hope of rescuing him, rather than save himself by climbing out through the astro hatch.

George Cross citation
Notice of his award appeared in The London Gazette of 2 April 1943.

Notes

British recipients of the George Cross
Royal Air Force recipients of the George Cross
Royal Air Force airmen
1942 deaths
Royal Air Force Volunteer Reserve personnel of World War II
Victims of aviation accidents or incidents in Sudan
1912 births
Military personnel from Sheffield
Royal Air Force personnel killed in World War II